The black-and-buff woodpecker (Meiglyptes jugularis) is a species of bird in the family Picidae.
It is found in Cambodia, Laos, Myanmar, Thailand, and Vietnam.
Its natural habitat is subtropical or tropical moist lowland forests.

References

black-and-buff woodpecker
Birds of Southeast Asia
black-and-buff woodpecker
black-and-buff woodpecker
Taxonomy articles created by Polbot